Punctum minutissimum is a species of minute air-breathing land snail, a terrestrial pulmonate gastropod mollusk in the family Punctidae, the dot snails.

Shell description
The shell of Punctum minutissimum is slightly translucent and pale brown in color. It is 1.1 to 1.3 mm wide, and has 3.5 to 4.5 whorls.  The outer shell surface has a sculpture of radial striae, which are obvious under magnification.  The underside of the shell has a very wide umbilicus, almost 25% of the shell's width.

Distribution
This species occurs in North America, from Maine to Florida, and west to Oregon and New Mexico.

Habitat
This small snail lives in damp leaf litter and decaying fallen beech logs.  It is often found around polypore and bolete fungi.

References

External links 

 https://web.archive.org/web/20111017080742/http://www.carnegiemnh.org/mollusks/palandsnails/pu_minu.html

Punctidae
Articles containing video clips
Gastropods described in 1841